Pierre de Lusignan may refer to:

 Peter I of Cyprus (1328–1369), king of Cyprus 1358–1369
 Peter II of Cyprus, the Fat (ca. 1357–1382), his son, king of Cyprus 1369–1382